Luigi Giuseppe Lasagna , best known as Dom Luís (4 March 1850 – 6 November 1895) was an Italian Salesian priest and Titular Bishop of the Diocese of Oea from his appointment by Pope Leo XIII on 10 March 1893 until his death on 6 November 1895. He was the founder of the Salesian works in Brazil and Uruguay.

Biography 

Born in Montemagno in 1850, Lasagna entered Valdocco's oratory and was ordained a Catholic priest on 8 June 1873. With the help of Don Bosco he was sent as a  missionary to Latin America in 1876. On 10 March 1893 he was appointed titular bishop of Oea and ordained on 12 March by Cardinal Lucido Maria Parocchi, choosing as his motto Sal agnis (pieces of salt).

Dom Luís began his missionary ministry in Uruguay and became director of the Colegio de Villa Colón. In 1881 he inaugurated a meteorological station, later founding a Catholic university and a high school of agriculture. In 1883 he started a ministry in Brazil.

He died in 1895 in Juiz de Fora, a victim of a railway accident, crushed by two trains of the Estrada de Ferro Central do Brasil. Seven nuns, five other priests and a stoker were also killed in the accident.

Bibliography 

 Paolo Albera, Mons. Luigi Lasagna: Memorie Biografiche, 1900.
 D. Barberis, Mons. Luigi Lasagna “Vale mecum”, San Benigno Canavese, 1901.
 Lorenzo Gentile, Missionsbischof Alois Lasagna, Salesianer 1850–1895, übersetzt durch Leo Schlegel, München, 1933
 Juan E. Belza, Luis Lasagna, el obispo misionero, 1969

See also 

 Missionary
 Salesians

References

External links
Profile of Mons. Lasagna www.catholic-hierarchy.org

1850 births
Italian Roman Catholic titular bishops
Salesian bishops
19th-century Roman Catholic titular bishops
1895 deaths
People from Montemagno